Randall "Randy" Findell (born December 17, 2001), known professionally as Brakence (stylized as brakence), is an American singer from Columbus, Ohio currently signed to Columbia Records and Sony Music. He is known for his hyperpop songs and falsetto vocals.

Early and personal life 
Randall Findell was born on December 17, 2001, in Columbus, Ohio. In 2019, he left Ohio State University, which would inspire his 2020 single "Dropout".

Career 
Brakence began uploading his work to music sharing platform SoundCloud in 2016, and released the EP FifthEnigma onto the site in December of that year. In 2018, he released his debut commercial EP Hypnagogia, which incorporated lo-fi hip-hop beats and emo-style vocals. In 2019, he released the EP Bhavana. In 2020, he released his debut album Punk2, which would be considered his breakthrough release. In December 2022, he released his sophomore album Hypochondriac under Columbia Records and Sony Music.

Discography

Studio albums

Extended plays

Singles

As lead artist

References

External links 
 
 

2001 births
21st-century American rappers
21st-century American singers
American electronic musicians
Columbia Records artists
Sony Music artists
Living people
American male guitarists
Guitarists from Ohio
Rappers from Ohio
Singers from Ohio
Musicians from Columbus, Ohio
People from Columbus, Ohio
Songwriters from Ohio
Hyperpop musicians